Heart of the Dragon is an American original web series directed by Jeff McDonald, written by James E. West II from The Proud Family and Moesha. It debuted on YouTube on July 27, 2014.

Plot
John Watanabe (Shin Koyamada) is hired by a very wealthy and mysterious beauty, Marta Williams, to serve as her personal bodyguard. John soon discovers that Marta has a secret. She is pregnant with a supernatural child giving her extraordinary abilities and that he and his client are connected to ancient prophecies. Now he must come to terms with the possibility of his own mortality and his role as protector to the savior of the world.

Development 
In 2010, Shin Koyamada initially called the meeting with his old martial arts classmates and old friends Jeff McDonald who have directed and produced an action short film Dream of the Lizard as well as James E. West II who wrote Disney Channel's The Proud Family and Paramount Television's Moesha to create and executive produce a new web series together. They used to meet up in a Starbucks in Burbank almost every week to brainstorm the new story ideas for the Heart of the Dragon. James E. West II wrote three episodes.

Production 
In 2013, the first episode directed by Jeff McDonald, written by James E. West II and starred by Shin Koyamada was all filmed in Los Angeles area in one day. As for the fight choreography of the scene, they brought in a Krav Maga instructor to add a new idea to the action choreography on top of the martial arts brought by the creators Shin Koyamada with Shaolin Kung Fu, Karate and Tae Kwon Do, Jeff McDonald with Shaolin Kung Fu and Krav Maga and James E. West with American Kenpo.

Cast
Shin Koyamada – John Watanabe
Jeannie Bolet –  Marta Williams 
Kevin Brewerton – Man in Black 
Stevie J. Hennessey – Frank
Nakoa Lee – Rob
Judy Nazemetz – Sherry

See also
 List of Web television series
 Web television
 Krav Maga

References

External links
 Official Facebook Page
 YouTube
 

2014 web series debuts
American drama web series
Martial arts web series
2010s YouTube series